The Serapeum of Saqqara was the ancient Egyptian burial place for sacred bulls of the Apis cult at Memphis. It was believed that the bulls were incarnations of the god Ptah, which would become immortal after death as Osiris-Apis. a name which evolved to Userhapi in Coptic, and Serapis, in the Hellenistic period.

Over a timespan of approximately 1400 years, from the New Kingdom of Egypt to the Ptolemaic Period, at least sixty Apis are attested to have been interred at the Serapeum. The earliest burials are found in isolated tombs, as the cult gained importance underground galleries were dug that connected subsequent burial chambers. One of the cult practices involved the dedication of commemorative stone tablets with dates relating to the life and death of the Apis. This data was crucial for the establishment of an Egyptian chronology in the 19th century.

It is part of the Saqqara necropolis, which includes several animal catacombs, notably the burial vaults of the mother cows of the Apis.

The Greater Vaults of the Serapeum, known for the large sarcophagi for the mummified bulls, are accessible to visitors.

History

Use 
The Apis cult dates back to very early times, possibly founded by pharaoh Menes, around 3,000 BC.

The most ancient burials at the Serapeum, found in isolated tombs, date back to the reign of Amenhotep III of the Eighteenth Dynasty in the 14th century BC.

Khaemweset, working as an administrator during the reign of his father Ramesses II (1279–1213 BC) in the Nineteenth Dynasty, ordered a tunnel with side chambers – now known as the "Lesser Vaults" – to be excavated, for the burial of the Apis bulls.

A second gallery of chambers, now called the "Greater Vaults", was commenced under Psamtik I (664–610 BC) of the Twenty-sixth Dynasty and extended during the Ptolemaic dynasty to approximately 350 m in length, 5 m tall and 3 m wide, along with a parallel service tunnel. From Amasis II to the end of the Ptolemaic dynasty, the sarcophagi for the Apis bulls were made from hard stone, weighing up to 70 tonnes each.

A long avenue, flanked by 370-380 sphinxes, likely was built under Nectanebo I, (379/8–361/0 BC) the founder of the Thirtieth Dynasty (the last native one).

Disuse 

The Serapeum was abandoned at the beginning of the Roman Period, shortly after 30 BC. Strabo (64 BC–30 AD) noted that some of the Sphinxes of the dromos had been covered in sand by the wind. Apis continued to be buried elsewhere in the Saqqara-Abusir region until the 3rd century AD. Arnobius, around 300 AD, stated that the Egyptians penalized anyone who revealed the places in which Apis lay hidden.

The looting of the Serapeum started at a time when hieroglyphs could still be read, as the names of the bulls were scratched out on many of the stelas. All tombs, except two, were plundered and desecrated. The bull mummies were torn to pieces, and stones were piled on the sarcophagi as a sign of contempt.

Rediscovery
The temple was discovered by Auguste Mariette, who had gone to Egypt to collect Coptic-language manuscripts, but later grew interested in the remains of the Saqqara necropolis.

In 1850, Mariette found the head of one sphinx sticking out of the shifting desert dunes, cleared the sand and followed the boulevard to the site.

After using explosives to clear rocks blocking the entrance to the catacomb, he excavated most of the complex. He found one undisturbed burial in the Lesser Vaults, which is now at the Agricultural Museum in Cairo.

Unfortunately, Mariette left most of his notes unpublished and many of them got destroyed when the Nile flooded the Museum of Egyptian Antiquities at Boulaq in 1878. Gaston Maspero released one volume of Le Sérapeum de Memphis based on the surviving manuscripts in 1882, a year after Mariette's death.

Tourism 
The Serapeum was open to visitors shortly after excavations, in the second half of the 19th century, Yet sands quickly made all parts but the Greater Vaults inaccessible.

For guests, prior to the installation of electric lamps, a series of candles on wooden stands lightly illuminated the vaults, and bright magnesium light was used from time to time. When the then Prince of Wales, Edward VII visited the Serapeum, he had luncheon with his party in one of the sarcophagi.

The 1992 Cairo earthquake caused cracks to appear on the tunnel walls, and the Serapeum was closed to the public. In 2001 conservation work started, stabilizing the roofs and walls, which lasted until 2012.

The majority of the Greater Vaults is accessible to tourists nowadays.

Rituals 

Four events marked the career of an Apis: birth, installation, death and burial. Diodorus Siculus reported that the bulls were honored as gods and consecrated to Osiris, and seem to be connected to the Sed festival.

Birth and installation 
After the living Apis had died the priests then sought out the young bull the soul of Osiris had migrated to, by identifying certain bodily marks. Herodotus reported that it needed to be black, with a three-cornered white spot on its forehead, the likeness of an eagle on its back, double tail-hairs and a knot under its tongue. According to Aelian each of these marks had a specific meaning; They symbolized, for example, the stars, the shape of the crescent moon and universe, and when the Nile would rise.

When the new Apis was found, the people stopped mourning. After it was kept at Nilopolis for forty days, a barge with a gilded stall brought the calf to the temple of Hephaestus at Memphis. For the next forty days only women were allowed to look at the calf, who revealed their generative parts to it. But at all other times women were forbidden in its presence.

The mother-cows were said to have been made pregnant by the light of heaven or the moonlight, and could never conceive again. They were kept with the Apis at Memphis and buried in their own catacomb, the Iseum, under a kilometre (0.6 mi) north-east of the Serapeum.

Death and burial 
When an Apis died it was at least partially consumed, the remains mummified or otherwise conserved prior to interment. The mummy was buried in splendor, reportedly 100 talents (2.6 tonnes of silver) were spent by the caretakers for the obsequies at the time of Diodorus.

Sarcophagi 

Nowadays 24 sarcophagi remain in the Greater Vaults. The oldest dates to the last great native ruler Amasis II, around 550 BC. The final was made some 500 years later, during the reign of the first Roman emperor Augustus. The winches, rollers and rails found in the Serapeum might have been used to transport the stones through the narrow tunnels. The sarcophagi were lowered into their final position by removing sand the burial chambers were filled with beforehand. All surviving coffers are made out of "costly stone" (granite, basalt, diorite, etc.), whereas the older sarcophagi, which are now lost, may have been of limestone, Gunn argued. Four bear inscriptions (dedications and/or spells of the pyramid texts), two of which have additional decorations.

Weight and dimensions 

Method of transport 
Mariette recognized traces of rollers on the floor of the galleries, and found two wooden horizontal winches, each operated with eight levers, in one of the niches. Heinrich Brugsch, visiting the Serapeum in 1853, noted that the "double-rails", on which the sarcophagi were rolled in, were still clearly preserved on the floor of the Ptolemaic service tunnel and the following passages.

Mariette describes that the rooms would be filled with sand to the level of the hallway so that the sarcophagi could be moved in horizontally, then the sand would be gradually removed to gently lower them. A special niche on each side allowed workers to remove the sand under the stones. Mariette found one sarcophagus that had only partially been let down into its recess, and conducted an experiment to test the aforementioned method. He was able to lower it with perfect regularity, even though its hollow was filled with rubble.

According to a stela found in the Serapeum, it took 28 working days to transport one of the sarcophagi and its lid into its burial chamber, in the 37th year of Ptolemy II, circa 247 BC.

Inscriptions and decorations 
Three of the 24 sarcophagi that remain in the Greater Vaults bear dedications by Amasis II, Cambyses II, and Khabash respectively; a fourth, inscribed with cartouches left empty, possibly dates to Ptolemy XII or Cleopatra.

 A red granite sarcophagus was dedicated by Amasis II. It is very well crafted, with the exterior of the body being embellished with panelling and a spell of the pyramid texts running round close to the upper edge. The symbols were coloured green, except the white-black Apis sign. Coffer and cover were separated, the latter now rests near the entrance ramp, also bearing an inscription, though no colour remains.

 Blocking the original entrance to the Greater Vaults is the "grey granite" sarcophagus dedicated by Cambyses II, first Persian ruler of Egypt. Only its lid is inscribed.

 A smaller sarcophagus stands at the entrance of an otherwise unused tunnel. A short text on its lid dates it to year 2 of Khabash, who had led a rebellion against the second Persian occupation. Its lid was found on the floor nearby. Brugsch argued that the two had never been brought together to enclose the deceased Apis. The lid was, however, put on top of the sarcophagus during past restoration works.

 Only one of the sarcophagi of the Ptolematic section is inscribed. The polished exterior is contrasted by the inscriptions and decorations which are merely scratched on and crudely formed. The cover is plain. Each side of the coffer bears a representation of a sarcophagus with a curved cornice and torus, of the Menkaure type. Panelling is found on all but the south side, which displays a house facade with a small bolted door. Along the torus, and between the double framing on each side are three lines of inscription, spells of the pyramid texts. The cartouches for the royal names were left empty. According to Gunn, because it remained to be seen under which king the Apis would die, which may point to the reign of Cleopatra and Ptolemy XIII (55-30 BC). On the basis of the position of the coffer, towards the end of the Ptolemaic tunnel, it might date to year 7 of Ptolemy XII (73 BC).

Isolated Tombs 

The oldest Apis burials in the confines of the Serapeum took place in Isolated Tombs, scattered here and there, without a regular plan. They consisted of a decorated chapel above ground with votive stelas fixed to the exterior walls, dedicated to the deceased animal. In the bedrock beneath, a sloping passage led to a rectangular chamber which housed coffins with the remains of the bull, canopic jars and other burial items.

Isolated Tombs were constructed in the 18th and 19th dynasty of Egypt, during a timespan of about 160 years, between the reigns of Amenhotep III and Ramesses II. Thereafter underground galleries were dug which connected subsequent Apis burial chambers.

In this early time of the Serapeum, the bodies of the bulls seem to not have been mummified. They may have been consumed, and what remained was conserved in bitumen or resin and placed in canopic jars and nested coffins.

Six Isolated tombs for eight bulls have been identified; three burials were undisturbed (one in chamber E and two in G) when discovered by Auguste Mariette in 1852:

 18th Dynasty (from c. 1390 to 1290 BC)
 Isolated Tomb A – Amenhotep III  Tomb A yielded four canopic jars, magic bricks, and multiple vessels, some of which bear prince Thutmose's name.
 Isolated Tomb B – Amenhotep III or IV  In tomb B canopic jars survived. 
 Isolated Tomb C – Tutankhamun  Tomb C contained canopic jars, pieces of the bull's wooden coffin and three glass pendants with the name of Tutankhamun.
 Isolated Tomb D/E – Horemheb  Chamber D of double-tomb D/E had plastered walls with painted images of the Apis, the four sons of Horus, Isis and other figures. Only one canopic lid evaded robbery.  Chamber E was hidden by a false wall and found intact. Within a lidless stone-built sarcophagus laid a panelled wooden coffin with a vaulted lid, which contained the remains of the Apis. The bull's skull rested on a cloth-covered mass of bitumen and large bovine bones, suggesting that the bull had been consumed before burial. In the corners of the room stood canopic jars. Under the floor Mariette found a dozen large pots containing burnt bones and ashes.
 19th Dynasty (from c. 1290 to 1250 BC)
 Isolated Tomb F – Seti I  Fourteen canopic vessels were also present in tomb F, along with four lids. Anything else had been robbed.
 Isolated Tomb G/H – Ramesses II, years 16 & 30  Tomb G contained a pair of undisturbed burials, overseen by the fourth son of Ramesses II, Khaemweset. The two square wooden coffins were varnished black with resin, their lower halves gilt. They contained similar arrangements: Within another square nested coffin lay the lid of a third, which was anthropoid with a gilded face. Under it was a bituminous mass of fragments of small bovine bones. Unlike tomb E, no skulls were present.  The central, first burial was accompanied by four canopic jars and a gold pectoral was found within. The coffin beside it had been damaged by stones fallen from the ceiling, and contained ox-head shabtis and statuettes of royalty, carnelian amulets and other jewellery, and a large quantity of gold foil.  The walls of the tomb were decorated with paintings and gold leaf. Niches contained shabtis, two pottery jackals on pylon-shaped bases, and amulets. An additional 247 shabtis were found in cuttings in the floor. Furthermore, a life-sized gilded wood statue representing Osiris was found affixed to the wall.  On the entrance ramp, thirteen stelae were found, which revealed the dates of the deaths of the bulls.  Room H was extensively robbed, but a surviving jar indicated it was a canopic room for the second bull of tomb G.

Lesser Vaults 
Working as an administrator during the reign of his father, Khaemweset, a son of Ramesses II (1279–1213 BC) of the Nineteenth Dynasty, ordered that a tunnel be excavated at the site, and a catacomb of galleries – now known as the "Lesser Vaults" – be designed with side chambers to contain the sarcophagi for the mummified remains of the bulls. But for one, all chambers were found emptied of their contents except for a disarray of dedication stelae.

New Kingdom

Third Intermediate Period

Shoshenq V
Two Apis died under Shoshenq V of the late 22nd Dynasty. The first one, installed in regnal year 2 of Pami, died and was buried in Shoshenq V's year 11. Its replacement in turn died and was buried in year 37. The latter's death was commemorated on several stelae, especially on the Stela of Pasenhor:

Greater Vaults

Late Period 
When the Apis died around 612 BC, the Serapeum was in a state of decay. Pharaoh Psamtik I renovated the temple, and started a second underground gallery of burial chambers, now known as the "Greater Vaults".

Cambyses II 
A sarcophagus dedicated by Cambyses II obstructs the original entrance way to the Greater Vaults.

According to Herodotus, when Cambyses II returned to Memphis, the people were celebrating. Cambyses asked the local rulers why they had not done so on his previous arrival, they explained that the Egyptians rejoiced not because of him, but a god—the Apis—that had revealed himself. Judging this to be a lie, he put them all to death. Next, the priests were summoned before him, who gave the same account. Thus he ordered the Apis to be brought. On its arrival, Cambyses drew his dagger and stabbed the calf in the stomach and smote its thigh. He laughed: "Wretched wights, are these your gods, creatures of flesh and blood that can feel weapons of iron? That is a god worthy of the Egyptians. But for you, you shall suffer for making me your laughing-stock." The priests were punished and the festival ended. The Apis died of the leg wound and was buried without Cambyses' knowledge.

Depuydt argues that the aforementioned sarcophagus was that for the predecessor of the Apis Cambyses allegedly slew, giving several reasons to corroborate Herodotus' story:

 Herodotus speaks of a calf, whereas the bull attested would have been quite old.
 That the people celebrated the installation of the new calf, one of the few reasons for an Apis to appear before the people.
 That the calf was buried in secrecy, thus no sarcophagus would be expected for it in the vaults.

Darius I 
Three Apis bulls were buried during the reign of Darius the Great. Since the entry way was essentially blocked by Cambyses' sarcophagus, a new makeshift entrance was cut closeby, that was used for the first two burials.

30 years later, for the burial of the third Apis, a considerably larger approach into the Greater Vaults was cut by extending the main ramp westwards beyond the old entrance stairway to a door in the bedrock, where a corridor was excavated to the south until it joined the Psamtik I gallery.

Khabash 
A corridor was dug southwards, from the bottom of Darius' new entrance ramp, perhaps intended for a new set of tombs, though it was not used. One smaller sarcophagus was placed at its entrance, dating to year 2 of Khabash.

Ptolemaic Kingdom 

The cult continued to bury Apis bulls throughout the Ptolemaic dynasty, 305 to 30 BC. Additionally, a "service tunnel" was dug, which bypassed earlier galleries. The votive stelae, previously fixed to the outside of the masonry that closed each burial chamber, were now put up collectively on the walls of the entrance and the new tunnel leading to the Ptolemaic section.

The thirteen niches of the Ptolemaic gallery correspond to the thirteen bulls attested during this period, from the one that died in year 6 of Ptolemy I Soter to the bull Augustus refused to visit. The presumably final sarcophagus was not transported all the way to its burial chamber but was abandoned in the "service tunnel". The Serapeum fell into disuse shortly after and was swallowed by the sands.

Temple and dromos 
The long avenue leading to the Serapeum, flanked by 370-380 sphinxes, was built under Nectanebo I, (379/8–361/0 BC) the founder of the Thirtieth Dynasty (the last native one). In front of the precinct, a Greek Temple stood besides an Egyptian-style chapel.

Statues of eleven Greek poets and philosophers faced the temple. Under the pavement, hundreds of bronze statuettes were found buried, representing all the deities of the Egyptian pantheon.

Stelae 
A stela, now located in the Louvre, attests the renovation of the Serapeum and its expansion:
Two bulls died under Amasis II, one in year 5, the other in year 23 of his reign. The sarcophagus of this latter still stands in situ in the Serapeum and is decorated with inscriptions and panelled reliefs. Its lid, now located at the main entrance, bears an inscription on the upper side. The life of the second is documented on a stela, which was found fixed on the masonry wall that once sealed the burial chamber:
A stele, dedicated to the first Apis that died in year 4 of Darius, states:
Stelae continued to be made during the Ptolemies, but instead of affixing them to the walls that closed each burial chamber, they were put up on the walls of the entrance and "service shaft".

A tablet commemorates the making of the underground burial chamber for the third Apis to live under Ptolemy II, including how long each phase took:

See also

 Buchis
 Mnevis
 Ptolemaeus son of Glaucias
 Serapeum of Alexandria

Notes

References

Bibliography

External links 

 Objects from the Serapeum at the Natural History Museum, Vienna
 Objects from the Serapeum at the Louvre

Egyptology
Serapeum
Saqqara
Sacred bulls
Catacombs
Animal worship
Cambyses II
Ptah